In set theory, a subset of a Polish space  is ∞-Borel if it
This concept is usually considered without the assumption of the axiom of choice, which means that the ∞-Borel sets may fail to be closed under wellordered union; see below.

Formal definition

Restricting to unions of length below  doesn't affect the possible unions (as any union of length  can be replaced by one of length  by removing duplicates), but ensures that the ∞-Borel codes form a set, not a proper class.

This can be phrased more set-theoretically as a definition by transfinite recursion as follows:

The axiom of choice implies that every set can be wellordered, and therefore that every subset of every Polish space is ∞-Borel.  Therefore, the notion is interesting only in contexts where AC does not hold (or is not known to hold). Unfortunately, without the axiom of choice, it is not clear that the ∞-Borel sets are closed under wellordered union.  This is because, given a wellordered union of ∞-Borel sets, each of the individual sets may have many ∞-Borel codes, and there may be no way to choose one code for each of the sets, with which to form the code for the union.

The assumption that every set of reals is ∞-Borel is part of AD+, an extension of the axiom of determinacy studied by Woodin.

Incorrect definition
It is very tempting to read the informal description at the top of this article as claiming that the ∞-Borel sets are the smallest class of subsets of  containing all the open sets and closed under complementation and wellordered union.  That is, one might wish to dispense with the ∞-Borel codes altogether and try a definition like this:

 For each ordinal α define by transfinite recursion Bα as follows:

 For a given even ordinal α, Bα+1 is the union of Bα with the set of all complements of sets in Bα.
 For a given even ordinal α, Bα+2 is the set of all wellordered unions of sets in Bα+1.
 For a given limit ordinal λ, Bλ is the union of all Bα for α<λ

 Bβ equals BΞ for every β>Ξ; BΞ would then be the collection of "∞-Borel sets".

This set is manifestly closed under well-ordered unions, but without AC it cannot be proved equal to the ∞-Borel sets (as defined in the previous section). Specifically, this set may contain unions of sequences  of ∞-Borel sets for which it is not possible to choose a code for each ; it is the closure of the ∞-Borel sets under all well-ordered unions (and complements), even those for which a choice of codes cannot be made.

Alternative characterization
For subsets of Baire space or Cantor space, there is a more concise (if less transparent) alternative definition, which turns out to be equivalent.  A subset A of Baire space is ∞-Borel just in case there is a set of ordinals S and a first-order formula φ of the language of set theory such that, for every x in Baire space,

 

where L[S,x] is Gödel's constructible universe relativized to S and x. When using this definition, the ∞-Borel code is made up of the set S and the formula φ, taken together.

References
 

Descriptive set theory